The 2009 Independent Spirit Awards can refer to:
24th Independent Spirit Awards, a ceremony held in 2009, honoring the films of 2008
25th Independent Spirit Awards, a ceremony held in 2010, honoring the films of 2009

Independent Spirit Awards